

Offseason
August 21: The 2009-10 preseason candidates list for the Women’s Wooden Award was released, naming 31 student athletes. Ify Ibekwe from Arizona was one of the candidates.

Regular season
The Wildcats will compete in the Iona College Tip-Off Tournament from November 14–15. In addition, the Wildcats will participate in the JHG Jam on November 21.

Roster

Schedule

Post Season

Pac-10 Basketball tournament
 See 2010 Pacific-10 Conference women's basketball tournament

See also
2009–10 NCAA Division I women's basketball season

References

Arizona Wildcats
Arizona Wildcats women's basketball seasons
Arizona Wildcats
Arizona Wildcats